Ueberreuter is an Austrian publishing house. Founded as Verlag Carl Ueberreuter in 1946 by Thomas F. Salzer (de), today the company is Austria's biggest publisher of non-fiction literature.

Ueberreuter's catalogue includes The Chronicles of Narnia series by C.S. Lewis, as well as the first five Captain Underpants books by Dav Pilkey.

External links 
 Ueberreuter official homepage

Culture in Vienna
Heidelberg
Book publishing companies of Austria